The Nathan Bedford Forrest Statue was a  tall statue of Confederate States of America Lt. General and first-era Ku Klux Klan Grand Wizard Nathan Bedford Forrest mounted on a horse in Nashville, Tennessee, located near Interstate 65 at 701D Hogan Road. The statue depicted Forrest shooting behind himself and was flanked by Confederate battle flags. Its abnormal facial features bore little resemblance to Forrest himself, and more resembled a screaming, deformed man.

Upon the death of its owner, the statue was donated to the Battle of Nashville Trust. It was removed on December 7, 2021. The trust cited its appearance, Forrest's irrelevance to the Battle of Nashville, and its impediment to the trust's mission in its decision, stating "even Forrest himself would think it was ugly."

Design
The monument was designed by Jack Kershaw, a Vanderbilt University alumnus, co-founder of the League of the South (a white nationalist and white supremacist organization) a member of The General Joseph E. Johnston Camp 28 Sons of Confederate Veterans. and a former lawyer to James Earl Ray, the assassin of Martin Luther King Jr. In the face of public criticism of the installation, Kershaw defended the statue by saying, "Somebody needs to say a good word for slavery."

Bill Dorris, friend of Kershaw and owner of the statue, told NPR in 2011: "As an artist, mediocre. As a thinker, he (Kershaw) was way ahead of a lot of people in his time." Dorris described Kershaw's process of sculpting: "Jack got some materials that I use to make bathtubs with. And he started with a butcher knife. That's the end result that you see out there right now." Kershaw told an interviewer that his Forrest is "crying 'Follow me!'"

The cartoonish character representing Forrest on the molded polyurethane sculpture was displayed on a rearing horse while both pointing a gun in his left hand in a direction behind him (presumably, at either his own or Union troops) and a sword in the right hand. The horse section of the statue was covered in gold leaf, while the section of the statue representing Forrest is covered in silver leaf. The statue itself was 25 feet tall.

Location and dedication
The property at 701D Hogan Rd is long and narrow, with Interstate 65 on one side and railway tracks on the other.

The monument was visible from the interstate by the northbound shoulder near mile marker 77 south of downtown Nashville. Around the time the statue was installed, the state cleared vegetation to make it more visible from the Interstate, primarily due to the efforts of then-Tennessee State Senator Douglas Henry (D-Nashville). The statue was controversial since before it was installed.

The statue was dedicated on July 11, 1998 by the Joseph E. Johnston Camp of the Sons of Confederate Veterans, who invited "40 other SCV camps, the United Daughters of the Confederacy and 10 re-enactment groups in period dress." The SCV camp called it one of its most ambitious projects and noted the additional sponsorship of The Southern League and the Mary Noel Kershaw Foundation. In total, the dedication ceremony was attended by approximately 400 people, including Alberta Martin, who was once believed to be the last surviving widow of a Confederate soldier, and Tennessee State Senator Douglas Henry.

Criticism and removal

The statue was shot at more than once, vandalized regularly over the years, and more recently defaced with Black Lives Matter slogans, but always repaired. Protestors once tried to pull it down by tying it to a train. It was protected by a padlocked gate. At the time of its removal, it had been splattered with pink paint and spray-painted with the word "monster."

In July 2015 the Metropolitan Council of Nashville and Davidson County sought permission to plant landscape screening in front of the monument to obscure its view from the interstate, but the request was denied by the Tennessee Department of Transportation.

The statue was criticized by then-councilwoman and former mayor Megan Barry in the wake of the 2015 Charleston church shooting, as "an offensive display of hatred that should not be a symbol for a progressive and welcoming city such as Nashville." Then-governor Bill Haslam said "It's not a statue that I like and that most Tennesseans are proud of in any way," in 2015.

On August 15, 2017 the mayor of nearby Oak Hill, Heidi Campbell, wrote an open letter to Governor Haslam urging the statue be obscured with landscaping.

The statue was removed on December 7, 2021, although the Confederate flags surrounding the statue remained in place. The statue was damaged during its removal, but the owners plan to keep the remains in storage and possibly put it up for sale.

Reactions

Shortly after the unveiling in 1998, BlueShoe Nashville noted that newspaper coverage showed that support for and dismay against the statue generally followed racial lines. It also critiqued the statue's quality, remarking that "Anyone seeing the crazed, pop-eyed look on the statue's face might wonder if the memorial is a homage, or a savage put-down."

In 2006, local blogger Brent K. Moore wrote that Forrest "has an expression that one makes after sitting on a thumb tack."

In 2015, The Washington Post called it "the weirdest Confederate statue in existence" and found the statue to have "a cartoonish and inadvertently satirical tone, incorporating elements of fiberglass and foil-candy wrapper coloring". The Post called the horse a "golden steed that looks like it was ripped from a merry-go-round for giants."

In June 2015 Gawker described the "alarming" statue as being created by a "fierce racist... for another bad man. The statue is so hilariously stupid that we should keep it forever" for it "perfectly honors the Confederacy."

A November 2015 Vibe.com article entitled 7 Controversial & Offensive Tourist Attractions In The U.S.  described the installation as the "ugliest" statue of Forrest and noted it is "surrounded by an overwhelmingly large display of numerous Confederate flags"

Rachel Maddow on MSNBC described it as having "terrifying marble blue eyes" and a "mouth like a circular saw".

Comedian Stephen Colbert first quoted President Trump's tweets about "preserving the beautiful monuments" in the wake of the 2017 Unite the Right rally in Charlottesville, Virginia then immediately mocked this statue by saying "apparently the Confederacy was founded by skirt-wearing nutcrackers riding wet lizards" and by mimicking the pose, shooting invisible soldiers following Forrest and riding an imaginary horse around the stage. Similarly, comedian John Oliver referred to the statue as being "objectively terrifying regardless of context", describing the statue's face as looking "like if a nickel did cocaine".

In 2017 Slate called the statue the "Confederacy's Dumbest Monument."

Atlas Obscura called it "One Confederate statue that accurately reflects the ugliness of its subject."

In an article titled The 10 Most Terrifying Public Statues Artnet news wrote the "statue (is) alarmingly racist, to say that it is also poorly done is a gross understatement", while Shareart led The 10 Most Bizarre Public Sculptures with this effort.

Salon described the statue as something "fashioned by someone who's had a human described to him but has never actually seen one in real life."

The Independent went with a simple "stupid, racist statue" and called for its removal.

Canada's National Post called the monument a "towering eyesore" and described it as "one of the most vile Confederate monuments in the great state of Tennessee."

In late December 2017, the statue was vandalized with pink paint. In October 2020, it was vandalized again by spray painting "Monster" along its side.

Bill Dorris
The owner of the statue and the land it sat on, Bill Dorris, was a Nashville lawyer and businessman. He regularly gave media interviews defending his right to display the Forrest statue and his flags. Although Dorris denied being a racist, he called slavery a form of "social security" for African Americans.

Dorris stated that he had "turned down requests from the KKK to hold rallies" at the site. Dorris also argued that removing the statue would be detrimental to Nashville's tourism industry, and compared it to historic plantations in the Nashville area like the Travellers Rest, The Hermitage, and the Belle Meade Plantation.

When the Metro Region suggested adding vegetation, Dorris told WPLN that "I've got some 1,800-foot flagpoles. I could put them up starting tomorrow. They're going to have to build a helluva wall and a helluva bunch of trees to block all that."

Dorris told Canada's National Post paper that he believed that the people against Confederate monuments in New Orleans were "cane blacks," who were probably "illegals to start with," in regards to controversies over Confederate monuments in that city. Dorris also said in that interview "Slavery was never an issue. Nathan Bedford Forrest was not a racist" and again called slavery a form of "social security" for African Americans, "a cradle-to-the-grave proposition."

Dorris died on November 24, 2020. His will left the statue and its site to the Battle of Nashville Trust, which opted to remove it. The statue was removed on December 7, 2021.

See also
List of Confederate monuments and memorials
Nathan Bedford Forrest
Nathan Bedford Forrest Monument
Nathan Bedford Forrest Bust
Statue of Lucille Ball, another statue noted for its perceived comical ugliness

References

External links
Closeup view of the statue at Gawker.com

1998 sculptures
1998 establishments in Tennessee
Buildings and structures in Nashville, Tennessee
Confederate States of America monuments and memorials in Tennessee
Equestrian statues in Tennessee
Statue
Outdoor sculptures in Tennessee
Vandalized works of art in Tennessee
Monuments and memorials in Tennessee
Removed Confederate States of America monuments and memorials